Luke Joseph McCarthy (born 7 July 1993) is an English footballer who plays as a midfielder who is currently a free agent.

He has previously played for Manchester City, Grimsby Town and Bury, Salford City, Airbus UK Broughton and Droylsden.

Playing career
McCarthy made his debut for Bury on the final day of the club's 2010–11 season coming on as a 92nd-minute substitute against Stevenage.

He signed a new 12-month contract with Bury in June 2011.

On 24 November 2011, he joined Grimsby Town on an initial one-month loan.

In May 2012, he was offered a new contract by Bury. He was released in January 2013. McCarthy went on to play for Salford City, Airbus UK Broughton, Droylsden and Mossley.

Career statistics

A.  The "Other" column constitutes appearances (including substitutes) and goals in the Football League Trophy.

References

External links

1993 births
Living people
Footballers from Bolton
English footballers
Association football midfielders
Manchester City F.C. players
Bury F.C. players
Grimsby Town F.C. players
Salford City F.C. players
Airbus UK Broughton F.C. players
Droylsden F.C. players
Mossley A.F.C. players
English Football League players
National League (English football) players